Gur i Zi may refer to:

Guri i Zi, Shkodër, a municipality in the Shkodër County, northwestern Albania
Gur i Zi, Dibër, a village in the municipality Arras, eastern Albania
Gur i Zi, Elbasan, a village in the municipality Labinot-Mal, central Albania